Éire Óg Annacarty GAA club is a Gaelic Athletic Association club in the parish of Anacarty & Donohill,  in west County Tipperary in Ireland.

History
The Éire Óg club's most notable player of the modern era is Pat Fox,  All-Ireland medallist for senior hurling in 1989 and 1991 during which period he was a leading scorer in the All-Ireland and Munster Championships.  The Club is predominantly a hurling club and has won the West Tipperary Senior Hurling Championship on many occasions including four years in succession from 1941 to 1944. During which period also, the club were Tipperary Senior Hurling Championship winners in 1943 when they defeated Moycarkey-Borris in the final under the captaincy of Tom Ryan. Éire Óg, thus became the first club since the foundation of the West Division in 1930 to win the championship, though a western team - Clonoulty - had a victory in 1888, long before the formation of the Division.

A prominent player of the 1940s was William (Bill) O'Donnell, winner of the All-Ireland Senior Hurling Championship with Tipperary in 1937, when the final was played in Fitzgerald Stadium, Killarney as Croke Park was temporarily out of commission while the old Cusack Stand was under construction. O'Donnell was a native of Golden and in his early playing days competed with the Golden Fontenoys before transferring his allegiance to Éire Óg on his appointment as Principal Teacher in Annacarty National School. He was also a referee of note in the 1940s and took charge of many important engagements in the inter-county arena, especially in Munster. Overall, the club has won the premier competition in which it competes, the West Tipperary Senior hurling Championship on 9 occasions in 1941,42,43,44,64,67,81,86,2013,14,15. While also sharing honours in combination teams to be victorious in 1961 as St. Vincent's (Cappawhite-Éire Óg) and more recently in 2004 as Éire Óg- Golden, which at the time of their victory was colloquially known as "The Combo" in recognition of their coalition with the Golden-Kilfeacle club.

Well-known and talented players of recent vintage include the O'Brien brothers, Damien, Ronan and Conor, all of whom have played for Tipperary. Though lesser known in the inter-county arena than his siblings, Ronan has created scoring records that outstrip all previous hurling records in the club's history. Such a feat is one to be proud of in an era when high-scoring is a modern feature of most hurling and football matches in all grades.

The club also plays in the divisional football championships of West Tipperary and in 2006, achieved senior status, and thus became the only club to contest the senior championships of West Tipperary in both hurling and football in the years 2007 to 2011. The football team played their part in local GAA history in 2008 when they took part in the first West Tipperary divisional senior final to be played under flood lights when they opposed Galtee Rovers at Cappawhite before an exceptionally large crowd. The team gave a creditable performance, before succumbing to their illustrious opponents and while still awaiting their first divisional senior football crown, they edged ever closer to ultimate honours with a maturing team. The summit was achieved in 2012 when they made history by winning the West Championship for the first time when they defeated the reigning champions Arravale Rovers in the final played at Lattin on Sunday, 14 October. on a score line 1-9 to 1-7. Thus ending their quest for ultimate divisional honours after many years of trying, especially during the new century when their efforts were thwarted on many occasions by the traditionalists, Aherlow, Arravale Rovers and Galtee Rovers. Their victory was widely celebrated coming after a frustrating year on the hurling fields.

Éire Óg claimed further honours in 2013 when the senior hurling team won the West Tipperary Senior Hurling championship, defeating Clonoulty-Rossmore in the final. This was a much cherished victory as their final opponents had been champions for a record six years in a row from 2007 to 2012. A notable feature of the 2013 victory was the introduction of 49-year-old John Quinn to win his 3rd senior medal, 32 years after winning his first and 27 years after his previous win. The club grounds are in Annacarty village, about seven miles from Cashel and is a focal point for the community in all its endeavours.

Notable players
 Brian Fox
 Pat Fox
 John Quinn

Honours
 Tipperary Senior Hurling Championship Winners (1) 1943 Runners-Up 1941
 Tipperary Intermediate Hurling Championship Winners (2) 1994, 2006
 West Tipperary Senior Hurling Championship Winners 1941, 1942, 1943, 1944, 1964, 1967, 1981, 1986, 2013, 2014, 2015
 West Tipperary Senior Football Championship (1) 2012
 Tipperary Intermediate Football Championship (1) 2001
 West Tipperary Intermediate Football Championship (5) 1988, 1997, 1999, 2000, 2001
 West Tipperary Intermediate Hurling Championship (4) 1994, 2002, 2004, 2006
 Tipperary Junior A Football Championship (1) 2010
 West Tipperary Junior A Football Championship (3) 1962, 1964, 2010
 Tipperary Junior B Football Championship (1) 2001
 West Tipperary Junior B Football Championship (3) 2000, 2001, 2014
 Tipperary Junior A Hurling Championship (1) 1977
 West Tipperary Junior A Hurling Championship (5) 1937, 1960, 1962, 1976, 1977
 Tipperary Junior B Hurling Championship (1) 2015
 West Tipperary Junior B Hurling Championship (3) 2001, 2005, 2015
 West Tipperary Under-21 A Football Championship (1) 1981 (with Cappawhite)
 West Tipperary Under-21 B Football Championship (2) 1998, 2009
 Tipperary Under-21 C Football Championship (1) 2006
 West Tipperary Under-21 C Football Championship (2) 2005, 2006
 Tipperary Under-21 A Hurling Championship (1) 1977 (with Cappawhite)
 West Tipperary Under-21 A Hurling Championship (7) 1962 (with Cappawhite), 1972 (with Clonoulty-Rossmore), 1973 (with Clonoulty-Rossmore), 1977 (with Cappawhite), 1978 (with Cappawhite), 1980  (with Cappawhite), 2001
 West Tipperary Under-21 (B) Hurling Championship (5) 1999, 2000, 2003, 2006, 2013
 Tipperary Minor (B) Football Championship (1) 1998
 West Tipperary Minor (B) Football Championship (2) 1986 (with Solohead), 1998
 Tipperary Minor (C) Football Championship (1) 2005
 West Tipperary Minor (C) Football Championship (1) 2005
 West Tipperary Minor (A) Hurling Championship (5) 1957 (with Cappawhite), 1962 (with Cappawhite), 1977 (with Cappawhite), 1978 (with Cappawhite), 2013 (with Galtee Rovers)
 West Tipperary Minor (B) Hurling Championship (3) 1988, 1998, 2006
 West Tipperary Minor (C) Hurling Championship (1) 2004

References

External links
Tipperary GAA site

Gaelic games clubs in County Tipperary
Hurling clubs in County Tipperary
Gaelic football clubs in County Tipperary